Soussoubro is a village in the Dolo Department of Bougouriba Province in south western Burkina Faso. The village has a population of 235.

References

Populated places in the Sud-Ouest Region (Burkina Faso)
Bougouriba Province